Amityville Playhouse (also known as The Amityville Theater) is a 2015 horror film written and directed by John R. Walker, and co-written by Steve Hardy. It is the thirteenth film to be inspired by Jay Anson's 1977 novel The Amityville Horror. Monèle LeStrat stars as Fawn Harriman, a recently orphaned Dannemora high school student who inherits a mysterious abandoned theatre located in Amityville, New York.

Plot 

Fawn Harriman, a Dannemora high school student whose parents died a year ago, inherits the Roxy, an abandoned theatre located in Amityville, New York. Fawn visits the Roxy with her friend Indy, boyfriend Kyle, Kyle's bullied younger brother, Jevan, and Jevan's friend Matt while one of her teachers, Victor Stewart, looks into the history of the theatre, as well as Amityville. Fawn and her friends become trapped in the theatre, which has no cellphone service, shortly after meeting Wendy, a runaway who has been squatting in the Roxy. After making several unsuccessful attempts at breaking out of the theatre, Fawn and the others encounter paranormal phenomena, like an apparition that resembles Fawn and a Ouija board that spells out the word "SISTER."

During the course of his research, Stewart notices that six people always die on every November 13 in Amityville. Stewart brings his findings to Elliot Saunders, the mayor of Amityville, who explains that the caves that are located beneath Amityville are a gateway to Hell that was accidentally unsealed centuries ago by the Shinnecock. The first six Shinnecock who entered the catacombs were possessed by demons, and buried alive in the caverns by the other Shinnecock. The catacombs were at some point unsealed again, and ever since a cult made up of Amityville's elite has sacrificed six people (including every elite's firstborn child) to the demons, to keep them appeased and to stop them from spreading from Amityville to the rest of the Earth. Fawn was supposed to be sacrificed to the demons alongside her twin sister, Adrienne, but her parents only gave the demons Adrienne. The cult orchestrated the deaths of Fawn's parents, knowing that they would try to stop them from "apologizing" to the demons for the Harrimans' earlier transgression by giving them Fawn. Saunders, wracked with guilt over all of the deaths that he has overseen and orchestrated, commits suicide after killing his own bodyguard and giving Stewart a special key that will grant Stewart access to the Roxy.

Stewart saves Matt, but Wendy disappears while Fawn is captured by decomposing demons who have killed and replaced a surveyor, Jevan, Indy, and Kyle. Stewart and Fawn escape from the demons, but just as they reach an exit, Fawn, her voice now demonic, drags Stewart back into the Roxy while yelling, "I'm Adrienne!"

Cast

Release 

Amityville Playhouse was released on DVD in the United Kingdom by 4Digital Media on April 13, 2015. 4Digital Media also released the film, under the name The Amityville Theater, on DVD in North America on June 23, 2015.

Reception 

Amityville Playhouse was deemed "a slog" that was full of "terrible actors" by Tex Hula of Ain't It Cool News. Patrick Cooper of Bloody Disgusting lambasted Amityville Playhouse, writing, "The film is absolutely miserable from the script to the acting. The lighting is either washed out or too dark and overall just avoid this mess." James Luxford of Radio Times was similarly critical of the film, calling it an unoriginal "shabby shock-fest" with "stiff and awkward performances" before concluding, "Unlikely to excite even the most ardent horror fans, Amityville Playhouse is an under-developed misfire that, if nothing else, makes you pine for scary movies of old." The film was allotted a score of 1/5 by The Guardian's Leslie Felperin, who succinctly stated that it suffered from "bad special effects, deliciously lousy scriptwriting, cack-handed direction and, above all, truly atrocious acting, attaining a level of ineptitude and woodenness that would shame the cheapest amateur porn film."

References

External links 

 The Brandon Sun
 
 Interview with John R. Walker at Native Monster

2015 directorial debut films
2015 films
2015 horror films
2015 independent films
2010s exploitation films
2010s ghost films
2010s mystery films
2010s psychological horror films
2010s supernatural horror films
2010s teen horror films
Amityville Horror films
British body horror films
British exploitation films
British ghost films
British horror films
British independent films
British mystery films
British psychological horror films
British sequel films
British supernatural horror films
British teen horror films
Canadian body horror films
Canadian ghost films
Canadian independent films
English-language Canadian films
Canadian mystery films
Canadian sequel films
Canadian supernatural horror films
Canadian teen films
Demons in film
2010s English-language films
Films about atonement
Films about brothers
Films about bullying
Films about cults
Films about educators
Films about human sacrifice
Films about mass murder
Films about orphans
Films about politicians
Films about runaways
Films about shapeshifting
Films about spirit possession
Films about twin sisters
Films set in 2014
Films set in 2015
Films set in a theatre
Films set in abandoned buildings and structures
Films set in London
Films set in Long Island
Films set in New York (state)
Films shot in England
Films shot in London
Films shot in Manitoba
Murder–suicide in films
Mystery horror films
Murder mystery films
Sororicide in fiction
Squatting in film
Teen mystery films
Unofficial sequel films
2010s Canadian films
2010s American films
2010s British films